Jugal is a rural municipality located in Sindhupalchok District of Bagmati Province of Nepal.

There are 7 wards known as 

1.Selang

2.Golche

3.Gumba

4.Pangtang

5.Baramchi

6.Hagam

7.Yanglakot

References

External links
 Official website

Populated places in Sindhupalchowk District
Rural municipalities in Sindhupalchowk District
Rural municipalities of Nepal established in 2017